Broadway Billy is a 1926 American silent sports film directed by Harry Joe Brown and starring Billy Sullivan, Virginia Brown Faire and Jack Herrick. The film was once thought to be lost, but as of February 2021 it was noted by the Library of Congress as recently found.

Cast
 Billy Sullivan as Billy Brooks 
 Virginia Brown Faire as Phyliss Brooks 
 Jack Herrick as Ace O'Brien 
 Hazel Howell as Delorai

References

Bibliography
 Munden, Kenneth White. The American Film Institute Catalog of Motion Pictures Produced in the United States, Part 1. University of California Press, 1997.

External links

1926 films
1920s sports films
Films directed by Harry Joe Brown
American silent feature films
Rayart Pictures films
American boxing films
American black-and-white films
1920s English-language films
1920s American films
1926 lost films
Lost American films
Lost sports films
Silent sports films